Old Jack may refer to:

Nickname
 John Driscoll, Australian jockey
 J. T. Hearne (1867–1944), English cricketer
 Jacques Henry (1942–2016), French private rally driver
 Jack Hinson (c. 1807–1874), American farmer and Civil War Confederate sniper
 Stonewall Jackson (1824–1863), Confederate general during the Civil War
 Mildirn (c. 1835–c. 1914), Aboriginal leader, translator and advisor also called Old Jack Davis
 Carbine (horse) (1885–1914), New Zealand-bred Thoroughbred race horse

Arts and entertainment
 Old Jack (album), the first album from Brazilian blues/rock band O Bando do Velho Jack, recorded in 1998
 the title character of Old Jack's Boat, a British pre-school children's television series (2013–2015)

Lists of people by nickname